Lynette Linton (born 1990) is a British playwright and the artistic director at The Bush Theatre. She directed the award-winning Donmar Warehouse production of Sweat. In 2019 she was named as one of Marie Claires "Future Shapers".

Early life and education 
Linton is of British Caribbean heritage and grew up in Leytonstone, East London. Her father is from Guyana and her mother is from Northern Ireland. Linton became interested in theatre and writing as a child. She has said that she wanted to be Malorie Blackman. At the age of eight she moved to Ballymena, where she and her brothers experienced racism. She studied English at the University of Sussex and soon after joined the National Youth Theatre. Here she met Rikki Beadle-Blair, who encouraged her to write a play. The play she wrote – Step – was about a young man working out his sexuality, inspired by James Baldwin. It was programmed at the Theatre Royal Stratford East. Her writing explores who she is and where her family are from. She trained as a Director at StoneCrabs in 2013.

Career 
In 2014 Linton founded the production company Black Apron Entertainment, which was named after the uniforms worn by her and her colleagues Daniel Bailey and Gino Green at their first jobs in John Lewis. Black Apron Entertainment have produced several plays and short films, including Passages: A Windrush Celebration at the Royal Court Theatre. Passages included seven monologue films that were written in response to the Windrush scandal.

In 2016 she was appointed as assistant director at the Gate Theatre. Linton directed Lynn Nottage's play Sweat at the Donmar Warehouse in 2018. The success of the production, which starred Clare Perkins, Martha Plimpton, Osy Ikhile and Parick Gibson, resulted in it transferring to the Gielgud Theatre in 2019. It was awarded the 2019 Evening Standard Play of the Year award. Her production of Richard II was the first ever all women of colour company performing a Shakespeare play on a UK stage.

In 2019 it was announced that Linton would become the artistic director of The Bush Theatre. Linton's appointment has been celebrated by the UK theatrical community, which is dominated by white men. When asked about the reason she applied for the job she quoted James Baldwin, "The place in which I'll fit will not exist until I make it". She hopes to make the theatre more welcoming to traditionally minoritized groups, including people of colour and those from working-class backgrounds. Her first season as artistic director started with a revival of Jackie Kay's Chiaroscuro and several other works by British writers of colour. The Evening Standard remarked that in terms of "sheer emotional power", nothing came close to Linton's Chiaroscuro.

She was selected as one of the Marie Claire "Future Shapers" in 2019. She was named as one of London's most influential people in the Evening Standards Progress List.

Theatrical works

Writing 
Amongst other theatres, Linton has written for Theatre Royal Stratford East and the Arcola Theatre.

 2013 Step
 2015 Chicken Palace
 2017 Hashtag Lightie

Directing 
 2014 This Wide Night at Albany Theatre
 2015 Assata: She Who Struggles at the Young Vic
 2016 The Rally at Theatre Royal Stratford East
 2017 Assata Taught Me at the Gate Theatre
 2018 This Is
 2018 Sweat at the Donmar Warehouse
 2019  Richard II at Shakespeare's Globe (co-directed with Adjoa Andoh)

References 

1990 births
Living people
British theatre directors
Black British women writers
British people of Irish descent
English people of Irish descent
British theatre people
English people of Guyanese descent
Alumni of the University of Sussex
National Youth Theatre members